Harry Davies is a Welsh professional Rugby Union player who played for Cardiff Blues, Bath rugby, and Bedford Blues, his main positions are fullback and wing. Davies is currently playing for the Seattle Seawolves, a Major League Rugby club.

Early life 

Davies started playing Rugby at Llantrisant RFC before becoming a part of the Cardiff Blues academy at the age of 17. During his career he was known as The Prince of Three Quarters.

Club Rugby 

Whilst part of the Blues academy Davies played on loan for Cardiff RFC. Davies also trained with the Welsh Sevens squad and represented the Blues in the World Club Sevens.

Davies made his first team debut for the Blues in November 2014 scoring a try in the LV Cup match against Newcastle Falcons.

In May 2016 it was announced that Davies had signed with Aviva Premiership side Bath for the 2016/17 season. Going on to make 7 appearances in all competitions for the club.

Davies joined English championship side Bedford Blues at the start of the 2018/19 season.

In 2020 Davies joined the MLR club Seattle Seawolves as a fullback.

External links 
  Harry Davies Bath Rugby Profile
  Harry Davies Seattle Seawolves Rugby Profile

1994 births
Living people
Welsh rugby union players
Rugby union wings
Rugby union fullbacks

References